Culling is the process of removing animals from a group based on specific criteria.

Culling or The Culling may also refer to:

People
Sir Culling Eardley, 3rd Baronet (1805–1863), an English Christian campaigner for religious freedom and for the Protestant cause
Thomas Culling (1896–1917), New Zealand's first World War I flying ace

Entertainment
The Culling (film), a 2015 supernatural thriller film
The Culling (comics)
The Culling (video game), a 2016 first-person shooter
The Culling, a 2009 episode from Sons of Anarchy

Other uses
Culling (computer graphics), a rendering technique